Ugo Passigli (born 14 December 1867) was an Italian physician. As of 1904, he was working in the health department of that city. He contributed many articles to scientific and literary journals, and published numerous pamphlets on medical subjects.

Selected publications

References

External links
 Works by Passigli at the Wellcome Collection

1867 births
Date of death missing
19th-century Italian Jews
19th-century Italian physicians
20th-century Italian Jews
20th-century Italian physicians
Italian medical historians
Italian medical writers
Jewish physicians